Ripon Falls at the northern end of Lake Victoria in Uganda was formerly considered the source of the river Nile. In 1862–3 John Hanning Speke was the first European to follow the course of the Nile downstream after discovering the falls that his intuition had marked as the source of the Nile.

The water from Ripon Falls falls into a narrow opening, which some define as the start of the River Nile.

He named the falls after George Robinson, 1st Marquess of Ripon, who was President of the Royal Geographical Society during 1859–60.

The Falls functioned as a natural outlet for Lake Victoria, until in 1954 the construction of Owen Falls Dam was completed, effectively extending Lake Victoria and submerging Ripon Falls.

References

 (See p. 694.)

Waterfalls of Uganda
Lake Victoria
Nile
Submerged waterfalls